Verbesina alternifolia is a species of flowering plant in the family Asteraceae. It is commonly known as wingstem or yellow ironweed. It is native to North America.

It is a larval host to the gold moth (Basilodes pepita) and the silvery checkerspot (Chlosyne nycteis).

References

alternifolia
Flora of the Northeastern United States
Flora of the Southeastern United States
Flora of the North-Central United States
Flora of Texas
Flora of Ontario